Henderson Park is a 47 hectare (117 acre) park located in Lethbridge, Alberta, Canada. The park contains many amenities and attractions, including a 24 hectare (60 acre) man-made lake, the largest lake in the city. Several annual events are held in the park.

History

Henderson Lake was originally a slough, but Mayor William Henderson, after whom the lake and park are named, was instrumental in developing the lake and surrounding park in preparation for the 7th International Dry-Farming Congress in 1912.

Amenities

Henderson Lake Playground: - A large, colourful playground with a soft Foam ground covering the entire play area. The playground is near the P-2 parking lot, the boat dock, and the boat ramp.
Group picnic shelters: - In addition to the Henderson Horseshoe Pit, there are three other group picnic areas: Kiwanis, Kinsmen and Gunnery.
Henderson Campground: -  This year-round campground is located just east of the park on Parkside Drive. Amenities include full and partial hookup sites, washrooms, laundromat, store, playground and a sani-dump. This is now closed and no longer available.
Henderson Horseshoe Pit: - At the west end of the park and near the pool, this fenced facility has 10 horseshoe pitches. It also doubles as a group picnic area with a kitchen and a large tent shelter. This facility is available between May and October.
Henderson Lake: This 24 hectare (60 acre) man-made lake provides boating and fishing opportunities from spring to fall, as well as the annual Lethbridge Dragon Boat Festival.
Henderson Lake Golf Course: - Since 1911, this public, 18-hole golf course has been located along the south shore of Henderson Lake.
Henderson Outdoor Pool: - Opened in 1962, the clover-shaped swimming pool is one of the city's only outdoor pools and includes a  sand volleyball court. It is open from the end of June until the end of August.
Henderson Park Ice Centre: - Located on the north side of Henderson Park, a full-size and mini size rink is available for private rentals from September to early April. The centre seats 700 and hosts tournaments.
Spitz Stadium: - This lighted baseball stadium is home to the Lethbridge Bulls and seats more than 3000 people.
Henderson Tennis Courts: - Operated by the Lethbridge Tennis Club, this facility includes a clubhouse and six lighted Plexi-Pave tennis courts.
Nikka Yuko Japanese Garden: - Built in 1967 as a symbol of Japanese-Canadian friendship, this  landscape garden features elements of five traditional Japanese gardens. It is open from mid-May to mid-October.
Rose Garden: - Situated in the northwest corner of the park, the garden was originally developed with the Girl Guides, and it is a popular area for wedding photos.
Trails: Facilities in the park are connected by paved trails, available for walking, jogging, cycling and in-line skating. The two largest trails circumvent the lake (2.8 km) and the park's perimeter (4.3 km). The citywide Coal Banks Trail runs through the park.

References

External links
Lethbridge Tennis Club
Henderson Lake Golf Club

Parks in Lethbridge